Official culture is the culture that receives social legitimation or institutional support in a given society. Official culture is usually identified with bourgeoisie culture. For revolutionary Guy Debord, official culture is a "rigged game", where conservative powers forbid subversive ideas to have direct access to the public discourse, and where such ideas are integrated only after being trivialized and sterilized.

A widespread observation is that a great talent has a free spirit. For instance Pushkin, regarded by some scholars as Russia's first great writer, infuriated Russian officialdom and particularly the Tsar, since

See also
 The arts and politics
 Doxology
 High culture
Popular culture

Notes

References
Lisa A. Lewis (1992) The Adoring audience: fan culture and popular media.
Guy Debord (1957) Report on the Construction of Situations. Paris.
Hal Foster Postmodern Culture By. Pluto Press. , 

Anthropology
Culture
Sociology of culture
Academic culture